The 1958 St Ann's riots, also known as the Nottingham riots or the Nottingham race riots, was a racially motivated riot on 23 August 1958 in the suburb of St Ann's in Nottingham. Racism after post-war immigration from the Caribbean led to racial tensions, which exploded into clashes in the summer of 1958. Several men and women were injured, and one man needed 37 stitches after a throat wound. The riots led to discussions between Caribbean countries and the UK government, which were intensified a week later by the Notting Hill riots in London.

The events were downplayed by Nottingham City Police's Chief Constable at the time Capt. Athelstan Popkess who claimed they were not racially motivated.

References 

History of Nottingham
Immigration to the United Kingdom
Racism in the United Kingdom
1958 in the United Kingdom
Caribbean diaspora in Europe
1958 riots
Race riots in England
August 1958 events in the United Kingdom